is a Japanese astronomer and a prolific discoverer of asteroids. Between 1991 and 1998, he discovered 52 minor planets in collaboration with fellow observer Shohei Suzuki at Mount Nyukasa Station. Both astronomers are graduates of Waseda University, after which they named the asteroid 9350 Waseda in 1991. Hirasawa is also a teacher.

List of discovered minor planets

References

See also 
 

20th-century Japanese astronomers
Discoverers of asteroids

Year of birth missing (living people)
Living people